Khalil or Khaleel (Arabic: خليل) means friend and is a common male first name in the Middle East, the Caucasus, the Balkans, North Africa, West Africa, East Africa, Central Asia and among Muslims in South Asia and as such is also a common surname. It is also used amongst Turkic peoples of Russia and African Americans. The female counterpart of this name is Khalila or Khaleela.

In other languages
The following names can be interpreted as Khalil:
Arabic: Khalil, Khaleel, Halil, Khelil, Kalil(Ar: خليل)
Hebrew: Khalil (He: חליל)
Persian: Khalil (Fa: خلیل)
Azerbaijani: Xəlil
Kurdish: Xelîl
Turkish: Halil
Bengali: Kholil (খলিল), Khalil (খালিল), Khaleel (খালীল)

Persons with the given name

Khaleel
 Khaleel Mamoon (born 1948), Urdu poet
 Khaleel-Ur-Rehman Azmi (1927–1978), Urdu poet

Al-Khalil
 Al-Khalil ibn Ahmad al-Farahidi: an 8th-century Muslim scholar best known as the author of Kitab al-'Ayn

Khalil
Khalil bey Khasmammadov (born  1873), Azerbaijani politician 
Khalil (actor) (1903–1941), Indian actor
Khalil (singer) (born 1994), American singer
Khalil Abou Hamad (1936–1992), Lebanese lawyer and politician
Khalil Ahmad (basketball) (born 1996), American basketball player
Khalil Ahmed (1936–1997), Pakistani composer
Khalil Azmi (born 1964), Moroccan footballer
Khalil Bass (born 1990), American football player
Khalil Davis (born 1996), American football player
Khalil Dorsey (born 1998), American football player
Khalil Fong (born 1983), Hong Kong singer and songwriter
Kahlil Gibran (1883–1931), Lebanese-American artist, poet and writer
Khalil Greene, American baseball player
Khalil Herbert (born 1998), American football player
Khalil al-Hibri, Lebanese politician
Khalil ibn Ishaq al-Jundi (died 14th-century), Egyptian jurisprudent
Khalil Mobasher Kashani (born 1951), Iranian Shia Cleric
Khalil Kain (born 1964), American actor
Khalil Khamis (footballer, born 1992) (born 1992), Emirati footballer
Khalil Khamis (footballer, born 1995) (born 1995), Lebanese footballer
Khalil Mack (born 1991), American football player
Khalil Maleki (1903–1969), Iranian politician
Khalil Mamut (born 1977), Uyghur refugee
Khalil el-Moumni (1941–2020), Moroccan imam
Khalil Paden (born 1989), American football player
Khalil Ramos (born 1996), Filipino actor
Khalil Rashow (born 1952), Yazidi-Kurdish academic
Khalil Rountree Jr., (born 1990), American mixed martial artist
Khalil al-Sakakini (1878–1953), Palestinian academic
Khalil Shakir (born 2000), American football player
Khalil Taleghani (1912–1992), Iranian engineer and politician
Khalil Tate (born 1998), American football player
Khalil Tatem (born 1997), Filipino-Canadian rapper known professionally as Killy
 Khalil-ur-Rehman Qamar (born 1962), Pakistani Writer
Khalil Wheeler-Weaver, American serial killer
Khalil Yosef Danker (born 1984), Israeli actor, singer, and model

Khelil
 Khelil Bouhageb (1863-1942), Tunisian politician and reformer

Persons with the surname

Khaleel
Bob Khaleel, American hip hop artist, better known by his stage name Bronx Style Bob
Ibrahim Khaleel (born 1982), Indian cricketer

Khalil
Ahmed Khalil, Emirati footballer
Christel Khalil, American actress of Pakistani and African descent
Faisal Khalil, Emirati footballer
Joseph Abu Khalil (1925–2019), Lebanese politician and journalist
Rabih Abou-Khalil, Lebanese oud player and composer

Khelil
Chakib Khelil (born 1939), Algerian politician, minister
Rima Khelil (born 1989), Algerian team handball player

Fictional characters
Khalil, a character debuted in Jonah: A VeggieTales Movie and appearing in the VeggieTales series
Inayat Khalil, a villain in K.G.F: Chapter 2
Prince Khalil, a character in The Princess Diaries
Khalil Flemming, a Season 1 contestant in Fetch! with Ruff Ruffman
Khalil Harris, fictional character in The Hate U Give
Khalil Payne, alter-ego name Painkiller, a main character in Black Lightning
Khalil Utbah, a character appearing in the anime series Inazuma Eleven

See also
 Kahlil
 Khalil (disambiguation)
 Khalil Allah (disambiguation)

Arabic masculine given names
Bosniak masculine given names
Turkish masculine given names